State Highway 63 (SH 63) is a State Highway in Kerala, India that starts in Vypin and ends in Munambam. The highway is 25.5 km long.

The route map 
Fort Vypin – Puthuvype – Njarakkal – Cherai – Pallippuram - Munambam

See also 
Roads in Kerala
List of State Highways in Kerala

References 

State Highways in Kerala
Roads in Ernakulam district